Oktyabrsky is a rural locality (a settlement) in Verkh-Suyetsky Selsoviet, Suyetsky District, Altai Krai, Russia. The population was 182 as of 2013. There are 4 streets.

Geography 
Oktyabrsky is located 13 km northwest of Verkh-Suyetka (the district's administrative centre) by road. Beregovoy is the nearest rural locality.

References 

Rural localities in Suyetsky District